The 2009 Bank of the West Classic was a tennis tournament played on outdoor hard courts. It was the 38th edition of the Bank of the West Classic, and was part of the WTA Premier tournaments of the 2009 WTA Tour. It took place at the Taube Tennis Center in Stanford, California, United States, from July 27 through August 2, 2009. It was the first women's event on the 2009 US Open Series.

WTA entrants
Players committed to participating in the singles event for 2009.

 Seedings are based on the rankings of July 20, 2009.

Other entrants
The following players received wildcards into the singles main draw

  Hilary Barte
  Stéphanie Dubois

The following players received entry from the qualifying draw:
  Melanie Oudin
  Alla Kudryavtseva
  Angela Haynes
  Lilia Osterloh

Finals

Singles

 Marion Bartoli defeated  Venus Williams, 6–2, 5–7, 6–4
It was Bartoli's 2nd title of the year, and 5th of her career.

Doubles

 Serena Williams /  Venus Williams defeated  Yung-Jan Chan /  Monica Niculescu, 6–4, 6–1

References

External links
 Official Bank of the West Classic website
 WTA tournament details

Bank of the West Classic
Bank of the West Classic
Silicon Valley Classic
Bank of the West Classic
Bank of the West Classic
Bank of the West Classic